Lloyd French (born 22 December 1947) is  a former Australian rules footballer who played with Richmond in the Victorian Football League (VFL).

French began his playing career with Scottsdale in the NTFA and was a member of that club's 1968 premiership team. He also won the club Best and Fairest award that year.

Notes

External links 		
		
		
		
		
		
		
Living people		
1947 births		
		
Australian rules footballers from Tasmania
Richmond Football Club players
Scottsdale Football Club players